Akihiro Asai (born September 13, 1975) is a Japanese race car driver. Started open-wheel racing in 1994. Won East & West Japanese Formula 4 titles in 1997. Also competed in Formula Holden Australian Driver's Championship (1998–1999, 2002) and CART Toyota Atlantic (2000). Started entering GT car racing in 2003 from Team Taisan in the Japanese GT Championship. Competed in the Japanese GT Championship and Super GT in 2004, 2005 and 2010. Also raced in the 2005 Super Taikyu Series championship. From 2010, started to participate racing in south east Asia region and in 2011 won the Supercar Thailand N.A. class Championship. Races widely in GT Asia, Asian Le Mans Series, Thailand Super Series.

Racing record

Complete Super GT results

References

Driver Database stats

1975 births
Japanese racing drivers
Atlantic Championship drivers
Super GT drivers
Living people
Formula Holden drivers
Asian Le Mans Series drivers
21st-century Japanese people